Source literature (understood as printed texts) is a kind of information source. It might, for example, be cited and used as sources in academic writings, and then called the literature on the subject.

The meaning of "source literature" is relative. From the point of view of a bibliographic index the indexed papers are "source literature". For example, the Social Sciences Citation Index is a "source index" covering the journals being indexed. These journals are the source literature from the point of view of this index. But from the point of view of the indexed papers they are the bibliographical references contained in the single papers "source literature". 

In the humanities, the term "source literature" has a more precise meaning than "published sources": Many archives, for example, publish important sources to be used by historians and other scholars as reliable editions of formerly unpublished sources. The publishing of such sources requires knowledge of text philology and other fields. But this kind of expertise put into the publishing of source literature should be differentiated from the kind of expertise needed in order to use the sources in, for example, historical research. A historian may or may not use such "source literature" and on the basis of his research publish a paper, which in the UNISIST model is considered primary literature.

Søndergaard, Andersen and Hjørland (2003) thus suggest that source literature is a distinct kind of literature to be distinguished from primary literature.

See also
 Sourcebook
 Primary source
 Secondary source

References
 Trine Fjordback Søndergaard, Jack Andersen and Birger Hjørland (2003): Documents and the communication of scientific and scholarly information. Revising and updating the UNISIST model. "Journal of Documentation", 59 (3), pp. 278–320. 

Library science terminology